Nathan Foad (born December 30, 1992) is an English actor and writer known for Newark, Newark and Our Flag Means Death.

Career 
Foad graduated from Guildford School of Acting. Afterwards, he built his career as a comedy writer, before he started to gain traction as an actor. He starred in the 2022 comedy series Our Flag Means Death as Lucius, the ship's scribe. Foad created and wrote the British sitcom Newark, Newark.

Personal life
Foad grew up in Newark-on-Trent; his first summer job was at his mother's fish and chip shop. Foad is openly gay, having come out to his family in his mid-teens. In an interview at the 2022 Chicago Comic & Entertainment Expo, Foad discussed that he has been in a monogamous relationship with his boyfriend for 9 years.

Filmography

Television

References

1992 births
Living people
English screenwriters
English actors
English gay actors
People from Newark-on-Trent
Alumni of the University of Surrey